Perfect Sting (foaled 1996 in Kentucky) is an American Thoroughbred Championracehorse and broodmare. Bred by Frank Stronach's Adena Springs Farm and raced by his Stronach Stables, she was sired by Red Ransom and out of the mare Valid Victress.

Perfect Sting raced from age two through five during which time she won the 2000 Breeders' Cup Filly & Mare Turf for trainer Joe Orseno and was voted that year's American Champion Female Turf Horse. She was retired to broodmare duty after her 2001 campaign having won fourteen of twenty-one starts with career earnings of US$2,202,042.

Pedigree

References

1996 racehorse births
Racehorses bred in Kentucky
Racehorses trained in the United States
Breeders' Cup Filly & Mare Turf winners
Eclipse Award winners
Thoroughbred family 20-a